Susquehanna Railroad may refer to:
Susquehanna Railroad (1833), a paper railroad conceived to connect the canal at Nanticoke with New York State
Susquehanna Railroad (1851-1854), predecessor of the Northern Central Railway (Pennsylvania system) in Pennsylvania
Susquehanna Railroad (1891–1893), predecessor of the Buffalo and Susquehanna Railroad (Baltimore and Ohio system) in Pennsylvania

See also 
 Susquehanna Railway